James Packer (born 2 December 1847, date of death unknown) was a Barbadian cricketer. He played in one first-class match for the Barbados cricket team in 1865/66.

See also
 List of Barbadian representative cricketers

References

External links
 

1847 births
Year of death missing
Barbadian cricketers
Barbados cricketers
People from Saint Michael, Barbados